Saraswathy Vidyalaya is an educational institution situated in Arapura, Thiruvananthapuram, India. The school was established in May 1991.

Notable alumni
 Gokul Suresh (Indian actor)

References

Schools in Thiruvananthapuram district
Educational institutions established in 1991
1991 establishments in Kerala